Nikoleta Celárová (born 27 February 1983) is a Slovakian retired ice hockey forward, currently active as an ice hockey official with the International Ice Hockey Federation (IIHF).

International career
Celárová was selected for the Slovakia national women's ice hockey team in the 2010 Winter Olympics. She played in all five games, but did not record a point. She played in all seven games of the 2010 Olympic qualifying campaign scoring twenty-three points.

Celárová also represented Slovakia at five IIHF Women's World Championships, across two levels. Her first appearance came in 2003, when she led the tournament in scoring.

Career statistics

International career

References

External links

1983 births
Living people
Ice hockey players at the 2010 Winter Olympics
Olympic ice hockey players of Slovakia
People from Kežmarok
Sportspeople from the Prešov Region
Slovak women's ice hockey forwards